The National Comorbidity Survey: Baseline (NCS-1) was the first large-scale field survey of mental health in the United States.  Conducted from 1990–1992, disorders were assessed based on the diagnostic criteria of the then-most current DSM manual, the DSM-III-R (Diagnostic and Statistical Manual of Mental Disorders, Third Edition, Revised).  The study has had large-scale implications on mental health research in the United States, as no widespread data on the prevalence of mental illness was previously available.

The National Comorbidity Survey: Reinterview (NCS-2) was a follow up study conducted between 2001 and 2002.  The participants in NCS-1 were re-interviewed with the aim to collect information about changes in mental disorders, substance use disorders, and the predictors and consequences of these changes over the ten years between the two surveys.

In conjunction with the NCS-2, two other surveys were done.  The National Comorbidity Survey Replication (NCS-R) was a study done with 9,282 new participants.  And the National Comorbidity Survey: Adolescent Supplement (NCS-A) was a study done between 2000 and 2004 with 10,000 adolescents.

Notable findings 

 The lifetime prevalence of at least one mental disorder: 57.4%
 12 month prevalence of at least one mental disorder: 32.4%
 Comorbidity: Of the people who had experienced a mental illness in their lifetime (48% of the population), 27% had experienced more than one. The resulting average is 2.1 mental disorders per disordered person.
 Only 40% of people who had ever had a disorder received professional treatment.
 Only 20% of people who had had a disorder within the past year received professional help.
</ref>

References

Further reading

External links
 
 

Health surveys
Prevalence of mental disorders
Research projects
Epidemiological study projects
Psychiatric research
Research in the United States